The Fatehpur derailment was the derailment of the train Kalka Mail near Fatehpur, Uttar Pradesh, India on Sunday, 10 July 2011. Seventy people were killed and more than 300 injured in the accident. Sources state that the train derailed following the sudden use of the emergency brake.

Overview 

The accident occurred at 12:20, when the 15 coaches of Howrah-Kalka Mail derailed near Malwan. The train had left Howrah and was heading towards Kalka when the incident happened. The number of passengers on board was not immediately known, though initial reports said that up to a thousand people were on the train at the time.

The train was travelling at the speed of 108 km/h on the Howrah - New Delhi Line when it derailed.

Fire and sparks were reported in the AC compartments of the train. The coaches were being cut with gas cutters and more than 200 policemen were involved in conducting rescue operations.

The Indian Army deployed 100 soldiers to the accident site, and two rescue trains from Kanpur and Prayagraj (Formerly known as Allahabad) also went to the location.

As per The Times of India report dated 05-08-2011; it was a fault in the rail track that derailed the Delhi-bound Howrah-Kalka Mail on 10 July, where 70 people were killed. 

The inquiry conducted by chief commissioner of railway safety in its preliminary report revealed that the cause of the accident was "failure of equipment -permanent way", or a breakage in the rail track.

References

Railway accidents in 2011
2011 disasters in India
Railway accidents and incidents in Uttar Pradesh
History of Uttar Pradesh (1947–present)
Fatehpur, Uttar Pradesh